The men's individual compound competition at the 2011 World Archery Championships took place on 5–10 July 2011 in Torino, Italy. 132 archers competed in the qualification round on 4 July; the top 104 archers qualified for the knockout tournament on 7–8 July, with the semi-finals and finals on 9 July.

Fifth seed Christopher Perkins from Canada won the men's individual competition, defeating Jesse Broadwater in the final by one point.

Seeds
The top eight scorers in the qualifying round were seeded, and received byes to the third round.

Draw

Top half

Section 1

Section 2

Section 3

Section 4

Bottom half

Section 5

Section 6

Section 7

Section 8

Finals

References

2011 World Archery Championships